Amorbia colubrana is a species of moth of the family Tortricidae. It is found in Ecuador (Carchi Province, Pichincha Province and Napo Province), Peru and Colombia. It is found at altitudes above 2,000 meters.

The length of the forewings is 13–14 mm. The ground colour of the forewings is light brown and the hindwing scaling is straw yellow.

References

Moths described in 1866
Sparganothini
Moths of South America